The 1906 Connecticut gubernatorial election was held on November 6, 1906. Republican nominee Rollin S. Woodruff defeated Democratic nominee Charles Frederick Thayer with 54.83% of the vote.

General election

Candidates
Major party candidates
Rollin S. Woodruff, Republican
Charles Frederick Thayer, Democratic

Other candidates
Ernest D. Hull, Socialist
Matthew E. O'Brien, Prohibition
Charles F. Roberts, Socialaist Labor

Results

References

1906
Connecticut
Gubernatorial